Epilampra is a genus of cockroach in the family Blaberidae. There are more than 70 described species in the genus Epilampra.

Species
These 71 species belong to the genus Epilampra:

 Epilampra abdomennigrum (De Geer, 1773)
 Epilampra acutipennis (Serville, 1838)
 Epilampra amapae Rocha e Silva & Gurney, 1962
 Epilampra amoena Rocha e Silva, 1965
 Epilampra anderi Princis, 1946
 Epilampra azteca Saussure, 1868
 Epilampra basistriga Walker, 1868
 Epilampra belli Fisk & Schal, 1981
 Epilampra berlandi Hebard, 1921
 Epilampra bivittata Saussure, 1864
 Epilampra brasiliensis (Fabricius, 1775)
 Epilampra bromeliacea Princis, 1965
 Epilampra bromeliadarum (Caudell, 1914)
 Epilampra burmeisteri (Guérin-Méneville, 1857)
 Epilampra caizana Giglio-Tos, 1897
 Epilampra caliginosa Walker, 1868
 Epilampra campestris Rocha e Silva & Aguiar, 1978
 Epilampra carsevennae Bonfils, 1975
 Epilampra castanea Brunner von Wattenwyl, 1865
 Epilampra cicatricosa (Rehn, 1903)
 Epilampra cinerascens Brunner von Wattenwyl, 1865
 Epilampra colorata Rocha e Silva & Gurney, 1962
 Epilampra columbiana Saussure, 1895
 Epilampra conferta Walker, 1868
 Epilampra conspersa Burmeister, 1838
 Epilampra crassa Saussure, 1868
 Epilampra crossea Saussure, 1864
 Epilampra cubensis Bolívar, 1888
 Epilampra egregia Hebard, 1926
 Epilampra exploratrix (Gurney, 1942)
 Epilampra fugax (Bonfils, 1969)
 Epilampra fusca Brunner von Wattenwyl, 1865
 Epilampra grisea (De Geer, 1773)
 Epilampra guianae Hebard, 1926
 Epilampra gundlachi Rehn & Hebard, 1927
 Epilampra haitensis Rehn & Hebard, 1927
 Epilampra heusseriana Saussure, 1864
 Epilampra heydeniana Saussure, 1864
 Epilampra hualpensis Uribe, 1978
 Epilampra imitatrix Saussure & Zehntner, 1893
 Epilampra insularis Bolívar, 1888
 Epilampra involucris Fisk & Schal, 1981
 Epilampra irmleri Rocha e Silva & Aguiar, 1978
 Epilampra jorgenseni (Rehn, 1913)
 Epilampra josephi Giglio-Tos, 1898
 Epilampra latifrons Saussure & Zehntner, 1893
 Epilampra limbalis Brancsik, 1901
 Epilampra maculicollis (Serville, 1838)
 Epilampra maculifrons Stål, 1860
 Epilampra maya Rehn, 1903 (maya cockroach)
 Epilampra mexicana Saussure, 1862
 Epilampra mimosa Rocha e Silva & Aguiar, 1978
 Epilampra mona Rehn & Hebard, 1927
 Epilampra opaca Walker, 1868
 Epilampra pereirae Lopes, Oliveira & Assumpção, 2014
 Epilampra quisqueiana Rehn & Hebard, 1927
 Epilampra rothi Fisk & Schal, 1981
 Epilampra sabulosa Walker, 1868
 Epilampra sagitta Hebard, 1929
 Epilampra savinierii [temporary name]
 Epilampra shelfordi Hebard, 1919
 Epilampra sodalis Walker, 1868
 Epilampra substrigata Walker, 1868
 Epilampra tainana Rehn & Hebard, 1927
 Epilampra taira Hebard, 1926
 Epilampra taracuae Princis, 1948
 Epilampra testacea Brunner von Wattenwyl, 1865
 Epilampra thunbergi Princis, 1949
 Epilampra unistilata Fisk & Schal, 1981
 Epilampra wheeleri Rehn, 1910
 Epilampra yersiniana Saussure, 1864

References

Cockroaches
Articles created by Qbugbot